Libidibia coriaria, synonym Caesalpinia coriaria, is a leguminous tree or large shrub native to the Caribbean, Central America, Mexico, and northern and western South America. Common names include divi-divi, cascalote, guaracabuya, guatapana, nacascol, tan yong, and watapana (Aruba).

Description 

L. coriaria rarely reaches its maximum height of  because its growth is contorted by the trade winds that batter the exposed coastal sites where it often grows. In other environments it grows into a low dome shape with a clear sub canopy space. Leaves are bipinnate, with 5–10 pairs of pinnae, each pinna with 15–25 pairs of leaflets; the individual leaflets are 7 mm long and 2 mm broad.

Taxonomy
The species was first described by Nikolaus Joseph von Jacquin in 1763, as Poinciana coriaria. In 1799, Carl Ludwig Willdenow transferred it to the genus Caesalpinia, and in 1830, Diederich von Schlechtendal transferred it to his newly created genus Libidibia. The genus Libidibia was not always accepted and the species was usually placed in Caesalpinia, until molecular phylogenetic studies led to the reinstatement of Libidibia.

Chemistry 
Tannins are extracted from divi-divi pods for use in leather production.

Among the molecules isolated is corilagin, whose name comes from the specific epithet of the plant.

In culture
Divi-divi is the national tree of Curaçao. It is also very common and popular on Aruba.

Uses
According to the FAO's Ecocrop database, the pods provide tannin and a black dye used in the tanning industry and for ink. The pods also have medicinal properties. The hard, dark colored wood is used for carpentry. The tree can be planted for shade. Yields of pods may be 45–135 kg per tree per year.

See also
 Krummholz
 Reaction wood
 National Festival of the Dividivi

References

External links
 
 

Caesalpinieae
Plants described in 1799
Symbols of La Guajira Department
National symbols of Curaçao
Trees of the Caribbean
Trees of Central America
Trees of Mexico
Trees of Venezuela
Trees of Guatemala
Trees of Colombia
Flora without expected TNC conservation status